Gorovu is a nearly extinct Ramu language of Papua New Guinea.

It is spoken in the two villages of:
Bangapela village, Bang Wokam ward, Yawar Rural LLG, Bogia District, Madang Province
Iabu Rural LLG, Bogia District, Madang Province

References

Porapora languages
Languages of East Sepik Province
Endangered Papuan languages